The Churchill Mountains are a mountain range group of the Transantarctic Mountains System, located in the Ross Dependency region of Antarctica. They border on the western side of the Ross Ice Shelf, between Byrd Glacier and Nimrod Glacier.

Several of the range's highest summits, including Mounts Egerton, Field, Nares, Wharton, and Albert Markham were first seen and named by the Discovery Expedition of 1901–1904 (aka: British National Antarctic Expedition), under Robert Falcon Scott

The mountains were mapped in detail by the USGS from Tellurometer surveys during 1960–61, and by United States Navy air photos in 1960.

They were named by the US-ACAN for Sir Winston Churchill.

Mountains and peaks

Mount Albert Markham
Mount Albert Markham is a striking flat-topped mountain, standing midway between Mount Nares and Pyramid Mountain. Discovered by the Discovery Expedition and named for Admiral Sir Albert Hastings Markham, a member of the Ship Committee for the expedition.

Mount Egerton 
Mount Egerton is a mountain rising five km north-northwest of Mount Field. Discovered by the Discovery Expedition and named for Admiral Sir George Le Clerc Egerton, a member of the Arctic Expedition of 1875-1876, one of Scott's advisors for this expedition.

Mount Field 
Mount Field is a mountain standing 5 km SSE of Mount Egerton. Discovered and named by the Discovery Expedition.

Mount Frost 
Mount Frost is a mountain standing 4 mi S of Mount Zinkovich, at the southern side of the head of Silk Glacier. Named by Advisory Committee on Antarctic Names (US-ACAN) for Lieutenant Col. Foy B. Frost, USAF, commanding officer of the Ninth Troop Carrier Squadron, which furnished C-124 Globemaster airlift support between New Zealand and the Antarctic and from McMurdo Sound inland to Byrd, Eights, and South Pole Stations during U.S. Navy (USN) Operation Deep Freeze 1962.

Mount Hamilton 
Discovered by the Discovery Expedition and named for Admiral Sir Richard Vesey Hamilton, who served on Arctic voyages (1850–54) and was a member of the Ship Committee for this expedition.

Mount Nares 
Mount Nares is a massive mountain located just south of Mount Albert Markham and overlooking the head of Flynn Glacier. Discovered by the Discovery Expedition led by Scott, who named it for Sir George S. Nares, captain of an Arctic expedition in 1875-76, and a member of the Ship Committee for Scott's expedition.

Pyramid Mountain 
Pyramid Mountain is a conspicuous pyramidal mountain standing 4 mi N of Mount Albert Markham. Discovered and named by the Discovery Expedition.

Mount Tuatara 
Mount Tuatara is a mountain standing on the southern side of Byrd Glacier, 7 mi N of Mount Hamilton. Mapped by the New Zealand Geological Survey Antarctic Expedition (NZGSAE) (1960–61) who so named it because the long spiny summit ridge resembles a lizard. The Tuatara is a reptile endemic to New Zealand.

Turk Peak 
Turk Peak is a large hump-shaped peak being the central of three peaks on a ridge 6 mi N of Mount Zinkovich. Named by Advisory Committee on Antarctic Names (US-ACAN) for Lieutenant Col. Wilbert Turk, commander of the 61st Troop Carrier Squadron which initiated the flights of C-130 Hercules aircraft in Antarctica in January 1960.

Mount Wharton 
Mount Wharton is a mountain standing 8.8 km (5.5 mi) west of Turk Peak. Discovered by the Discovery Expedition and named for Sir William Wharton, Hydrographer to the Royal Navy, 1884-1904.

Young Peaks 
Young Peaks is a group of peaks along a ridge running west–east, starting 5 km east of Mount Coley. The feature is 5 km long with summits rising above 1200 m. Flanked by Lee Glacier at north and Jorda Glacier at south. Named in honor of Pamela Young who was the first female event member in the New Zealand Antarctic Research Program (NZARP).

Mount Zinkovich 
Mount Zinkovich is a pointed mountain standing 4 miles (6 km) north of Mount Frost at the north side of the head of Silk Glacier. Named by Advisory Committee on Antarctic Names (US-ACAN) for Lieutenant Colonel Michael Zinkovich, United States Air Force (USAF), commanding officer of the 1710th Aerial Port Squadron, which furnished airlift support between New Zealand and Antarctica, and from McMurdo Sound inland to Byrd, Eights, and South Pole Stations during U.S. Navy Operation Deep Freeze 1962.

Sub−ranges
Sub−ranges of the Churchill Mountains include:

Carlstrom Foothills

Carnegie Range

Cobham Range

Darley Hills

Holyoake Range

Nash Range

Surveyors Range

Other features

 Ahern Glacier
 Algie Knoll
 Alligator Eyes
 Black Icefalls
 Bradshaw Peak
 Brecher Glacier
 Byrd Glacier
 Carlstrom Foothills
 Carr Crest
 Cerberus Peak
 Chapman Snowfield
 Cooper Snowfield
 Cupcake Peaks
 Donnally Glacier
 East Egerton
 Elder Peak
 Entrikin Glacier
 Festive Plateau
 Flynn Glacier
 Gamble Glacier
 Horseshoe Nunatak
 Jorda Glacier
 Keating Massif
 Kelly Plateau
 Kent Plateau
 Kilroy Bluff
 Kiwi Pass
 Lee Glacier
 Mansergh Wall
 McLay Glacier
 Miscast Nunataks
 Mount Coley
 Mount Durnford
 Mount Frost
 Mount Hubble
 Mount Liard
 Mount Massam
 Mount Moa
 Mount Morse
 Nimrod Glacier
 Peacock Heights
 Prior Cliff
 Reid Bluff
 Roberts Pike
 Rutland Nunatak
 Silk Glacier
 Sivjee Glacier
 Sleek Spur
 Soza Icefalls
 Stark Ridge
 Swithinbank Range
 Taniwha Cove

See also

References

Mountain ranges of the Ross Dependency
Transantarctic Mountains
Shackleton Coast